Kristi snowcats were 1950s/1960s tracked vehicles suitable for snow and other terrain and produced originally in Colorado and then later in Washington.

Propeller drive before track drive

According to the introduction, contained in the operators manual:
"The development of the Kristi snow vehicles began in early 1947 in the form of a very unusual snow plane.  This propeller driven vehicle utilized a control by which the operator could tilt the machine from side to side, in effect raising one ski and lowering the other to negotiate up to 45-degree side slopes and permit high-speed turns without skidding.  This tilting and edging of skis after the manner of a skier was called "Ski-Action".  Since it could do a "Christie" up or down hill, the trade name "Kristi" was adopted."

The Kristi snowplane  featured a revolutionary change in ski handling concepts.  As stated in the manual, the design was inspired by snow skiers who angled their skis to effect a turn (this angling of skis is called a Christie) and it allows for both higher speed turns and greater control.  The theoretical advantage of the Kristi system in a snowplane would make for safer and faster turns on frozen lakes.  The photos of snowplanes clearly show stationary mounted rear skis and a turning front ski, the Kristi design improved on this design by allowing the skis to carve their edges into the snow as traditional snowplanes's rear skis will skid laterally during a turn.  The major advancement of the Kristi tilt ski system apparently made no impact on the commercial or amateur snowplane industry as it did not appear to be used in practical application.  Perhaps because of the mechanical complexity of the original design, no snowplanes are known to exist that employ the "Christi Ski Action" concept.

Kristi's track driven vehicles
Kristi was technically interesting, but the company failed to produce quantities of snowcats to compete with other North American or European snowcat manufacturers. According to the July 1964 issue of Volkswagen Foreign Car Guide magazine, author Alan Arnold indicated the Kristi had a unique ability to raise or lower its tracks individually which had the effect of raising one side of the vehicle to keep the vehicle level while crossing side slopes.  Further, the front or rear of both tracks could be raised or lowered so the snowcat's cabin could remain level while climbing or descending slopes.

Kristi was commercially built in Colorado. The original Kristi company offered 3 basic models.  The models were the KT2, KT3 and KT4.  Total production of all the units combined, over the entire 12 year life of the original company's lifespan was lower than 1 year of production of commercially viable snowcats from Tucker Sno-Cat, Bombardier or Thiokol all of which were produced in North America during the same time period. The company changed ownership and moved to Washington and continued production. Production was always on a small scale, and the products were innovative. The most refined of the Kristi snowcats was the KT7, which was last produced and the least successful commercially with only 4 units built and 3 of them were prototypes that failed. The KT7 was designed and produced after the sale of the company and after it moved to Washington. It is possible that additional KT2, KT3 and KT4 units were manufactured by the new owners in Washington state but it is unlikely since the designs had not been substantially upgraded by the time the new owners purchased the company. A slightly smaller version of the KT3 was called the KT2. Both the KT2 and KT3 were powered by Volkswagen air-cooled 4-cylinder engines, it is reported that a small percentage may have been powered by Porsche engines. The KT2 and KT3 shared mechanicals and even shared the same operators manual. The VW engine developed 32 horsepower.

Kristi also built custom tilt bed trailers used for hauling the KT3 which used the same tires and wheels on the trailer as on the KT3.

Various different sales brochures make different claims about the transmissions used in the Kristi KT3. It is therefore possible to find a KT3 with either 8 or 9 forward gears, and either 4 or 3 reverse gears. The units with 8 forward/4 reverse had a High-Low range ratio of 7:1. All used joystick controls in a V shaped arrangement that were centered under tachometer.

Specifications from the sales brochure for the Kristi KT3 stated that it was 11' long, 7'4" wide and had a height of 5'9" with an empty weight of 2095 pounds. The KT3 was configured for 5 passengers and imparted 0.46 PSI of pressure onto the snow. It had a maximum cargo/passenger capacity of 1,500 pounds and a towing capacity of 2000 pounds. With a fuel capacity of 20 gallons of gasoline, it claims 15 to 18 hours of operating time and a top speed of 20 mph.

The KT3 sales brochure claimed the ability to climb a 100% grade with full load when not on the snow. It claimed the ability to climb a 70% grade in snow conditions with a full load and in soft snow it claims the ability to traverse a side slope with a 60% grade. The Kristi action adjustable track suspension will hold the cabin level on slopes with up to a 25% grade.

A larger Kristi snowcat was produced and designated the KT4 and the KT4a.  The KT4 had a fully enclosed fiberglass body while the KT4a was an open version and "a" designated that it was an amphibious unit capable of floating and crossing streams or ponds. Fred W. Crimson's book, U.S. Military Tracked Vehicles referred to the Kristi KT4a's protopype as the "Water Walker" due to its amphibious capabilities. The KT4 and KT4a units are very rare and less than 5 are known to exist of a total production that was probably under 20.  The KT4 was powered by a Chevrolet Corvair 6-cylinder gasoline engine.

A prototype model built on a modified Chevrolet 1/2 ton pick-up truck frame was built and designated the KWT. This unit still exists and is in storage.  The KWT, according to the prototype's announcement pre-sales brochure, was built for ranchers and farmers as a heavy duty all terrain vehicle capable of hauling and towing loads into remote snowbound locations.  It also was designed to be capable to be driven on the road with the tracks removed.  The KWT never reached the production. The engine specified was to be a 250-cubic-inch, or optionally a 292-cubic-inch, 6-cylinder gasoline powered, Chevrolet engine.  A brochure announces it would use conventional steering when driven as a wheeled vehicle but does not indicate how it would steer as a tracked vehicle.  This prototype vehicle still exists and is currently unused and in storage and owned by a private antique vehicle collector.

Washington, new owners and the KT7
Kristi eventually changed ownership and they moved to Washington. A Kristi-Washington KT3 brochure shows the later model KT3s were equipped with a 53 hp VW engine, or alternately with a Porche (sic) engine.  The brochure offers both new and remanufactured KT3 models for sale from the Washington facility.  It lists the top speeds of the KT3 at 20 mph when powered by the VW engine, and 25 mph when powered by the Porche (sic) engine.  Kristi of Washington developed a new model called the KT7 snowcat, of which only 4 were built and only 1 was successful #002. The KT7 used a Ford Anglia  gasoline engine controlled by governor over hydrostatic Vickers drive with body tilt.  The industrial engine has a 104 cu.in V-4 configuration generating 80 hp.  While never produced, the brochure also offered a V-6, 171 cu.in. engine as an option.  The engine was mounted in the middle of the snowcat with the driver and front passenger forward, and the rear passengers aft, facing the rear.  There were access doors on either end of the KT7 and the rear and the front look nearly identical save for the headlamps.  An early original brochure announcing the KT7 actually shows its designation as a KT3a and calls it an "improved KT3" but the production brochure has it designated as the KT7.  The KT7 was tested by the FAA for use in Alaska but failed to achieve a 20 mph speed requirement; the sales brochure claims a 15 to 25 mph speed "depending on transmission/engine options."  It is believed that this failure doomed the KT7, and ultimately lead to the demise of the company in the early 1970s.  Photos of the only known restored (by Allen Huston) KT7 Yetti are posted on this page, this unit is the last KT7 produced and is serial #002 owned and preserved by Marco Johnson Bellingham Wa , it is also the only unit that was modestly successful.

According to an original sales brochure, specifications for the KT7 indicate it was 12'1" long, was 8'2" wide to the outside of the tracks, and had a body width of 4'1" and a height of 5'6" tall with the body in the lowered position and 6'4" tall with the body in the raised position.  Ground clearance in the raised position is 16" and the weight is 3225# with a rated load of 1800#.  Climbing performance is "Up to 100% depending on the terrain surface conditions."

Competitors
Kristi lost out competitively to the Tucker Sno-Cat Corporation, which was also American based and in production during the same period. Tucker Sno-Cat is currently one of the most successful snowcat manufacturers in the world today and still producing machines. Thiokol was another American made contemporary of Kristi that focused on small snowcats, notably the Imp, Super Imp and Spryte models. Like the Kristi KT4a amphibious model, Thiokol manufactured an amphibious version of the Spryte, called the Swamp Spryte. Thiokol sold its snowcat division in 1978 to automaker John DeLorean who renamed the company LMC Logan Machine Company and produced snowcats under the DMC brand name for approximately two years prior to switching the name to LMC. LMC remained in business until 2000, but changed ownership in 1988. Other notable snowcats of the same era were the Aktiv Snow Trac, which, like the Kristi KT2 and KT3 were powered by Volkswagen and Porsche engines. The Snow Trac was successfully used in explorations in the Antarctic and the Arctic and attained production numbers of 2000 units and only ceased production in 1981 when Volkswagen discontinued the European production of the engines used to power the machines. Bombardier, of Canada, was also successful and is still in business today making aircraft, rail vehicles, snowmobiles, ATVs and watercraft.

While Kristi was commercially unsuccessful, it did outlive and out produce other companies that developed "snowplanes" largely because early in the life of the company they switched production from snowplanes to snowcats.  The original Kristi snowplanes  were very similar to the earlier Russian Aerosani snowplanes which were developed as early as World War I.  The Kristi design was more advanced than the Aerosani, and utilized adjustable ski action to perform higher speed turns and received a patent for its design in 1955.  Other competitors in the Snowplane market that failed to transition into tracked vehicle makers when the market changed included the Lorch Snowplane, the Steadman Snowplane, the Fudge Snowplane, the Lansing Snowplane in addition to many smaller manufacturers and homebuilders. Snowplanes are well suited to travel on frozen lakes and snowcovered fields or roads but are not suitable for use in mountains or on rough ground.  This limit probably led to their general demise as tracked vehicles are suitable for both types of terrain and may explain why Kristi remained in business for a longer period of time.

See also 

 Bombardier
 Logan Machine Company
 Snow coach
 Snowcat
 Snowmobiles
 The Shining (film) Stanley Kubrick movie featuring a Snow Trac and a Thiokol Imp

References

External links

 Kristi Snowcat Website

Tracked vehicles
Snowmobile manufacturers